"Get You the Moon" is a song by Italian Lofi producer Kina, featuring writer and vocalist Snøw. It was released on March 15, 2018, and later re-released under Columbia Records on October 8, 2018. A music video was released on the MrSuicideSheep YouTube channel on April 3, 2019. The song featured on Kina's debut EP Things I Wanted to Tell You (2020).

The song has attained over 650 million Spotify plays as of August 2021. It ranked second on Billboard'''s Top TV Songs list of March 2020, after appearing in an episode of the Netflix series On My Block. It was included as a "NOW What's Next!" bonus track on the 2019 US compilation Now That's What I Call Music, Vol. 71.

Background
Kina discovered featured vocalist Snøw from listening to his covers on YouTube. The song was described by Idolator'' as a "moody chill-pop anthem" and "equal parts sad, romantic and oddly relaxing", and is 60 beats per minute and in the key of C# minor. The music video was directed and drawn by animation artist JonJon.

Charts

Weekly charts

Year-end charts

Certifications

References

2018 songs
2018 singles